Bance is a Swedish, French and English surname. Notable people with the surname include:

Aristide Bancé (born 1984), Burkinabé footballer
Danny Bance (born 1982), English footballer
Libby Bance, English footballer
Peter Bance, British Sikh historian, author, and art collector